Ryomgård station is a railway station serving the railway town of Ryomgård on the peninsula of Djursland in Jutland, Denmark.

The station is located on the Grenaa railway line between Aarhus and Grenaa. It opened in 1876 with the opening of the Randers-Ryomgaard-Grenaa Line. Since 2019, the station has been served by the Aarhus light rail system, a tram-train network combining tram lines in the city of Aarhus with operation on railway lines in the surrounding countryside.

History 

The station opened on 26 August 1876 as the railway company Østjyske Jernbane (ØJJ) opened the railway line Randers-Ryomgaard-Grenaa from Randers to Grenaa. In 1877, ØJJ opened a branch line from Ryomgård to Aarhus, and just a few years later the trains starting running directly between Grenaa and Aarhus, with the Ryomgård-Randers section being reduced to a branch line used mostly for rail freight transport until it was closed altogether on 2 May 1971.

In 1911, another railway line from Ryomgård to the north of Djursland was added, making Ryomgård a railway hub on Djursland, when Ryomgård station became the southern terminus of the Ryomgård-Gjerrild Line from Ryomgård to the town of Gjerrild, which in 1917 was prolonged from Gjerrild to Grenaa. The Ryomgård-Gjerrild-Grenaa Line was closed in 1956.

From 2016 to 2019, the station was temporarily closed along with the Grenaa railway line while it was being reconstructed and electrified to form part of the Aarhus light rail system, a tram-train network combining tram lines in the city of Aarhus with operation on railway lines in the surrounding countryside. Since 2019, the station has been served by Line L1 of the Aarhus light rail network, operated by the multinational transportation company Keolis.

Architecture 
The station building from 1876 was designed by the Danish architect Niels Peder Christian Holsøe (1826–1895), known for the numerous railway stations he designed across Denmark in his capacity of head architect of the Danish State Railways.

See also 
 List of railway stations in Denmark
 Rail transport in Denmark

References

Citations

Bibliography

External links

 Aarhus Letbane
 Midttrafik

Railway stations opened in 1876
Railway stations in the Central Denmark Region
1876 establishments in Denmark
Niels Peder Christian Holsøe railway stations
Railway stations in Denmark opened in the 19th century